Metapolitics (sometimes written meta-politics) is metalinguistic talk about politics; a political dialogue about politics itself. In this mode, metapolitics takes on various forms of inquiry, appropriating to itself another way toward the discourse of politics and the political. It assumes a self-conscious role of mediating the analytic, synthetic, and normative language of political inquiry and politics itself.

The language used for studying, analyzing, and describing a language is a metalanguage. In current usage and praxis, the term metapolitics is often used in relation to postmodern theories of the Subject and their relation to political theory. In its broadest definition, metapolitics is a discipline that studies the relationship between the state and the individual.

Contemporary views

Two important contemporary thinkers in the field of metapolitics are Alain Badiou and Jacques Rancière. Discussing Badiou's Metapolitics, Bruno Bosteels asserts that:

See also
 Metaphilosophy

References

Further reading
Carlo Gambescia, Metapolitica. L’altro sguardo sul potere, Edizioni Il Foglio Letterario  2009, .

External links
A. J. Gregor. Metascience and Politics. Dictionary definition
Peter Viereck, Metapolitics: From Wagner and the German Romantics to Hitler, 2003. .
Peter Viereck, Metapolitics Revisited
Commentary on Alain Badiou's book Metapolitics
Leo Zaibert, Toward Meta-politics
Igor Efimov. Metapolitics: our choice and history (in Russian). Leningrad, 1991. 224 pages. 

Political terminology